Plus is a live EP by Matt Nathanson containing three songs. It was released on October 14, 2003, the same day as his full-length album Beneath These Fireworks.

Track listing
"Lucky Boy"  – Recorded live at Ned's Studio on August 20, 2003. Featuring Matt Fish on cello. Recorded and mixed by Larry Hirsch.
"Lost Myself in Search of You"  – Recorded live at Ned's Studio on August 20, 2003. Featuring Matt Fish on cello. Recorded and mixed by Larry Hirsch.
"Sad Songs"  – Recorded live on San Francisco Bay Area's radio station KFOG's Morning Show on August 28, 2003.

References
 Matt Nathanson official site

2003 EPs
Matt Nathanson albums
Live EPs
2003 live albums